Nizhnearmetovo (Tübänge Ärmet) is a rural locality (a selo) and the administrative centre of Armetovsky Selsoviet, Ishimbaysky District, Bashkortostan, Russia. The population was 590 as of 2010. There are 6 streets.

Geography 
Nizhnearmetovo is located 45 km northeast of Ishimbay (the district's administrative centre) by road. Verkhnearmetovo is the nearest rural locality.

References 

Rural localities in Ishimbaysky District